"King of Moomba" is a song by Australian rock/pop group Do-Ré-Mi released by Virgin Records in January 1988 as the second single from the group's second album The Happiest Place in Town. The song was written by lead vocalist Deborah Conway, drummerDorland Bray, bass guitarist Helen Carter and guitarist Stephen Philip. While the B-side "Tearing up the Carpet" was written by Carter and Philip. The song peaked at number 52 on the Australian charts.

Moomba in the song's title refers to the annual festival held in Melbourne which had an appointed 'King of Moomba' from 1967–1987 and was then replaced by a 'Moomba Monarch'. The 'Kings of Moomba' for the 1980s were TV actor Paul Cronin (1980), former footballer Lou Richards (1981), film, TV and stage actor Frank Thring (1982), TV personality Daryl Somers (1983), footballer Kevin Bartlett (1984), TV personality Ian "Molly" Meldrum (1985), motor racing driver Peter Brock (1986) and champion doubles tennis player Paul McNamee (1987).

Track listing
"King of Moomba"
"Tearing up the Carpet" (Carter, Philip)

Charts

Personnel
Do-Ré-Mi members
Dorland Bray — drums, percussion, backing vocals
Helen Carter — bass guitar, backing vocals
Deborah Conway — lead vocalist
Stephen Philip — guitar

References

1987 singles
Do-Re-Mi (band) songs